The Odeum Expo Center was a convention center located in Villa Park, Illinois.

The South Hall was also used as an arena with an 85-by-194-foot artificial turf surface for indoor soccer or indoor football. It seated 2,500 for indoor soccer, football or lacrosse, and up to 5,500 for boxing, MMA/UFC, wrestling, and concerts. There were also  of meeting space and a  lobby.

In 2010, the Odeum became the home to the Chicago Cardinals of the Continental Indoor Football League.  Also in 2010 the Chicago Riot of the Major Indoor Soccer League began play at the Odeum Expo Center. In 2014, the Chicago Blitz professional indoor football team began play at the Odeum in the CIFL. They continued their home games through 2016 as a member of the AIF, until the league folded and team subsequently cancelled their remaining season games.

In January 2022, it was announced that the Odeum would be sold and permanently closed at the end of May 2022.

See also
 List of convention centers in the United States

References

External links
 

Boxing venues in Illinois
Chicago Cheetahs
Convention centers in Illinois
Indoor arenas in Illinois
Indoor soccer venues in Illinois
Mixed martial arts venues in Illinois
Sports venues in DuPage County, Illinois
Tourist attractions in DuPage County, Illinois
Villa Park, Illinois
1981 establishments in Illinois
Sports venues completed in 1981
Wrestling venues in Illinois